La Montagne or La Montagne or Lamontagne is a surname of French (Norman) origins but is possibly related to some surnames within Ireland and England. The word "montagne" in French translates as the word "mountain" in English. Also, there were French Huguenots who settled within the United Kingdom during the 16th and 17th centuries. Anglicized form of Gaelic Ó Manntáin ‘descendant of Manntán’, a personal name derived from a diminutive of manntach ‘toothless’. Notable people with the surname include:

Armand LaMontagne (born 1939), American sculptor
Blanche Lamontagne-Beauregard (1889–1958), Canadian poet
Cynthia Lamontagne (born 1966), American actress
Francois Baquet Lamontagne (1646-1701), French soldier and Canadian pioneer
Gilles Lamontagne (born 1919), Canadian politician
Maurice Lamontagne (1917–1983), Canadian economist and politician
Noel LaMontagne (born 1977), American football player
Ovide Lamontagne (born 1957), American politician
Ray LaMontagne (born 1973), American singer-songwriter
Rene Morgan La Montagne, Sr. (1856–1910), American businessman
Rene Morgan La Montagne, Jr. (1882–19??), American polo player
Richie Lamontagne (born 1969), American boxer

See also
Manton (name)